The horse stance (sometimes called horse riding stance) is a common posture in Asian martial arts and takes its name from its resemblance to the position assumed when riding a horse. It is called mǎbù (馬步) in Chinese,  in Japanese, and juchum seogi (주춤 서기) or annun seogi (lit. sitting stance) in Korean. This stance can not only be integrated into fighting but also during exercises and forms. It is most commonly used for practicing punches or to strengthen the legs and back. The modified form of horse stance, in which heels are raised, is fighting stance in International Karate Tournaments. The Chinese form of horse stance is fighting stance which changes into front stance while using hip rotation to develop punching force.

Chinese martial arts

Mabu is used for endurance training as well as strengthening the back and leg muscles, tendon strength, and overall feeling and understanding of "feeling grounded". It is a wide, stable stance with a low center of gravity. Feet are placed 45 degree outward .

Northern styles
The ideal horse stance in most northern Chinese martial arts (such as Mizongquan and Chaquan) will have the feet pointed forward, thighs parallel to the floor, with the buttocks pushed out, and the back "arched up" to keep the upper body from leaning forward. The emphasis on this latter point will vary from school to school as some schools of Long Fist, such as Taizu and Bajiquan, will opt for the hips forward, with the buttocks "tucked in."

In Northern Shaolin, the distance between the feet is approximately two shoulder widths apart.

Southern Shaolin
Southern Chinese martial arts usually pronounce horse stance by its Cantonese pronunciation of "Sei Ping Ma". In Southern Shaolin, a wide horse riding stance is assumed as if riding a horse. Such low postures strengthen the legs of the practitioner. The horse stance in southern Chinese systems is commonly done with the thighs parallel to the ground and the toes pointing forward or angled slightly out.

Southern Chinese styles (such as Hung Gar) are known for their deep and wide horse stance.

See also Wushu Stances for more information.

Japanese martial arts

In Japanese martial arts, the horse stance (kiba-dachi) has many minor variations between individual schools, including the distance between the feet, and the height of the stance. One constant feature is that the feet must be parallel to each other.

Indian martial arts

What is referred to as the horse stance in south Indian martial arts is very different from the posture of the same name in other Asian fighting styles. Known in Malayalam as aswa vadivu or ashwa vadivu, it imitates the horse itself rather than the rider. In kalaripayat, the horse stance has the hind leg stretched completely backward while the knee of the front leg is bent ninety degrees. The horse stance is the main posture of the Shiva form and is related to the virabhadrasana (warrior pose) in yoga.

See also
 Squatting position

References

External links
Horse Stance Demo Horse stance demonstration
Kalari Animal Posture - Horse Horse stance of kalaripayat
Southern Shaolin Horse Stance - correct technique and training program Southern Shaolin Horse Stance - correct technique and training program

Chinese martial arts terminology
Partial squatting position
Stances
Horses in culture
Bodyweight exercises
Flexibility